Masella is a surname. Notable people with the surname include:

 Alfons Masella, Tongan rugby league footballer
 Benedetto Aloisi Masella (1879–1970), Italian Cardinal of the Roman Catholic Church
 Blanca Morales-Masella (born 1970), Guatemalan swimmer
 Gaetano Aloisi Masella (1826–1902), Italian Cardinal of the Roman Catholic Church
 Joseph Masella ( 1948–1998), American mobster
 Joseph Masella (french hornist) (1925–1996), Canadian french hornist and music educator
 Martin Masella (born 1969), Tongan rugby league footballer
 Tom Masella (born 1959), American football player and coach

See also 
 Masella, ski resort in La Cerdanya in Girona